A pincushion is a small cushion which is used in sewing to store pins or needles

Pincushion or Pin Cushion may also refer to:

"Pincushion" (song), a 1994 song by ZZ Top
Pin Cushion (film), 2017 film 
Pincushion distortion, a type of radial distortion (optics)
Pincushion sea star, Coscinasterias calamaria

Plants
 genus Chaenactis, known simply as "pincushions"
 Diapensia lapponica
 genus Leucospermum
 genus Navarretia
 genus Scabiosa
 Nertera granadensis, a ground cover with black/orange berries also known as coral bead or bead plant
 Pincushion cactus, several genera
 Pincushion coneflower, Isopogon dubius 
 Pincushion hakea, Hakea laurina